Ve'Achshav La'Helek Ha'Omanuti (ועכשיו לחלק האומנותי; "And now the artsy part") is the fifth studio album by the Israeli rapper Ravid Plotnik, also known as Nechi Nech, released on June 30, 2019 by The Eight Note.

Track listing

Notes 
 "Harbu Darb" contains a sample from "November" by Miri Mesika.
 "Emuna Iveret" contains a sample from "Dhub Utfatar" by Dudu Tassa and the Kuwaitys.
 "Olam U'Mlo'o" contains samples from "Mitoch Ha'Rega" by David Ma'ayan and "Ad Ha'Pa'am Ha'Ba'a" by Ehud Banai.
 "Slah Li Avi Ki Hatati" contains vocals by Berry Sakharof and sample from "Te'udat Zehut" by Buyaca.
 "Lema'ala" contains a sample from "She's My Baby" by Balkan Beat Box.

Personnel
Credits adapted from Linktone.

Instrumentation
 Yishay Swissa – additional keyboards , keyboards 
 Eyal Davidi – keyboards 
 Roei Fridman – percussions (tracks 1, 8, 11)
 Nir Danan – guitars (tracks 2, 12), bass (tracks 2, 6), Keyboards (track 6)
 Yakir Sasson – trumpet (tracks 4, 5), flute (tracks 4, 11)
 Amit Sagie – guitars, bass and keyboards (track 5)
 Itay Zvulun – guitars, keyboards (track 6)
 Amit Kechman – cello (track 7)
 Maya Blezitzman − cello (tracks 6, 8)
 Nimrod Bar − keyboards (track 9)
 Yonatan Ne'eman - keyboards , additional keyboards 

Technical
 Naor Ben Meir − mixing, recording
 Yishay Swissa − recording
 Sidney Toledano − mastering

Release history

References 

Hebrew-language albums
2019 albums
Ravid Plotnik albums